Fardaws Aimaq (born January 6, 1999) is a Canadian basketball player for the Texas Tech Red Raiders of the Big 12 Conference. He previously played for the Mercer Bears and the Utah Valley Wolverines.

Early life and high school career
Aimaq grew up swimming and practiced mixed martial arts for 11 years, earning a black belt. He started playing competitive basketball after growing to 6'3" during eighth grade. Aimaq attended Steveston-London Secondary School in Richmond, British Columbia. He led his team to its first-ever AAA provincial title game. Aimaq played a postgraduate season at Bridgton Academy in Bridgton, Maine. He averaged 18.6 points and 13.8 rebounds per game, earning First Team All-NEPSAC Class AAA honors. Aimaq committed to playing college basketball for Mercer.

College career
As a freshman at Mercer, Aimaq averaged five points and 5.3 rebounds per game. He left the program after head coach Bob Hoffman was fired. He transferred to Utah Valley and sat out for one season due to NCAA transfer rules. On December 12, 2020, Aimaq scored 27 points and grabbed a program-record 20 rebounds in a 93–88 loss to Wyoming. On January 15, 2021, he recorded 29 points and 14 rebounds in a 93–92 win over Seattle. On February 13, Aimaq posted 18 points and 25 rebounds, breaking his program record for rebounds in a game, as Utah Valley lost to Dixie State, 93–89. As a sophomore, he led NCAA Division 1 in rebounding with 15 rebounds per game in addition to 13.9 points, 1.6 assists and 1.7 blocks per game. Aimaq was named  WAC Men's Basketball Player of the Year and WAC Men's Basketball Defensive Player of the Year. Following the season, he declared for the 2021 NBA draft, but ultimately returned to Utah Valley for his junior season. As a junior, he averaged a career-high 18.9 points per game, along with 13.6 rebounds, 1.7 assists, and 1.3 blocks. He repeated as the WAC Defensive Player of the Year as well as a First Team All-WAC honor.

On March 18, 2022, Aimaq entered the transfer portal and also declared for the 2022 NBA draft while maintaining his college eligibility. On April 30, 2022, Aimaq committed to Texas Tech while also remaining in the NBA Draft.

Career statistics

College

|-
| style="text-align:left;"| 2018–19
| style="text-align:left;"| Mercer
| 29 || 5 || 14.9 || .517 || 1.000 || .420 || 5.3 || .2 || .2 || .8 || 5.0
|-
| style="text-align:left;"| 2019–20
| style="text-align:left;"| Utah Valley
| style="text-align:center;" colspan="11"|  Redshirt
|-
| style="text-align:left;"| 2020–21
| style="text-align:left;"| Utah Valley
| 22 || 22 || 30.5 || .485 || 1.000 || .618 || style="background:#cfecec;" | 15.0* || 1.6 || .2 || 1.7 || 13.9
|-
| style="text-align:left;"| 2021–22
| style="text-align:left;"| Utah Valley
| 32 || 32 || 34.4 || .490 || .435 || .723 || 13.6 || 1.7 || .7 || 1.3 || 18.9
|- class="sortbottom"
| style="text-align:center;" colspan="2"| Career
| 83 || 59 || 26.6 || .493 || .458 || .647 || 11.1 || 1.2 || .4 || 1.2 || 12.7

Personal life
Aimaq's father, Faramarz, is from Afghanistan but moved to Germany, before settling in Canada, to escape the Soviet-Afghan War. Aimaq is a Muslim.

References

External links
Utah Valley Wolverines bio
Mercer Bears bio

1999 births
Living people
Basketball players from Vancouver
Bridgton Academy alumni
Canadian expatriate basketball people in the United States
Canadian men's basketball players
Canadian Muslims
Canadian people of Afghan descent
Centers (basketball)
Mercer Bears men's basketball players
Texas Tech Red Raiders basketball players
Utah Valley Wolverines men's basketball players